The Emerald City is the capital city of the fictional Land of Oz in L. Frank Baum's Oz books and in the 1939 film adaptation The Wizard of Oz.

Emerald City may also refer to:

Places nicknamed "Emerald City"

Dublin, Georgia, U.S.
Esmeraldas, Ecuador
Eugene, Oregon, U.S.
Green Zone, International Zone of Baghdad, Iraq
Los Angeles in the 1920s, California, U.S.
Muntinlupa, Philippines
Seattle, Washington, U.S.
Sydney, Australia
Syracuse, New York, U.S.

Arts, entertainment, and media

Films
Emerald City (film), a 1988 Australian film starring Nicole Kidman, adapted from David Williamson's eponymous 1987 play
The Emerald City of Oz, a 1987 Canadian film adaption of L. Frank Baum's book by the same title in the Oz series

Literature

Emerald City (play), a 1987 satirical play by David Williamson about the Australian film industry that was adapted into the eponymous 1988 film
Imperial Life in the Emerald City, a 2006 book about the Baghdad Green Zone by Rajiv Chandrasekaran
The Emerald City of Oz (1910), the sixth book in L. Frank Baum's Oz series, adapted into a 1987 Canadian film with the same title

Music

"Emerald City" (song), recorded as a single in 1967 by The Seekers
"Emerald City", a song by Dramarama from the 1985 album Cinéma Vérité
Emerald City (Teena Marie album), released in 1986
Emerald City (John Abercrombie and Richie Beirach album), released in 1987
Emerald City (John Vanderslice album), released in 2007
The Emerald City (Melanie Doane album), released in 2011
The Emerald City, by The Tossers, released in 2013

Television
Emerald City (TV series), a 2017 American fantasy television series on NBC based on L. Frank Baum's Oz series
"The Emerald City" (Boardwalk Empire), the title of season 1, episode 10 of the HBO television series Boardwalk Empire (2010)

Other arts, entertainment, and media
Emerald City (magazine), a science fiction fanzine published from 1995 to 2006
Emerald City, a prison unit in the fictional Oswald Maximum Security Prison of HBO's Oz television series (1997–2003)
Emerald City Comicon, an annual comic book convention in Seattle, Washington, U.S.

Enterprises and organizations nicknamed "Emerald City"
Emerald City, former theme of the MGM Grand Las Vegas hotel and casino in Las Vegas, Nevada, U.S.
Foxwoods Resort Casino, in Connecticut, U.S.
Oracle Corporation headquarters in Redwood Shores, California, U.S.
Washington, D.C. Temple of the Church of Jesus Christ of Latter-day Saints in Kensington, Maryland, U.S.

See also
Green City (disambiguation)